George Andrew McNamara (August 26, 1886 – March 10, 1952) was a Canadian professional ice hockey player. He was a member of the 1914 Toronto Blueshirts Stanley Cup champions. His brothers Harold and Howard also played professional ice hockey. McNamara was inducted into the Hockey Hall of Fame in 1958.

Playing career
When McNamara was a youngster, his family moved to Sault Ste. Marie, Ontario and it was in the Soo that he first learned the game of hockey.  McNamara made his professional hockey debut playing with the Sault Ste. Marie Marlboros of the International Hockey League during the 1906–1907 season. George and his brother, Howard, also briefly a member of the Soo Marlboros, were known as the "Dynamite Twins" because of their bone-crunching body checks.

The International Hockey League folded in 1907 when a purely amateur game in Canada finally gave way to professional leagues and the top Canadian players were lured back to Canada to play. McNamara, a big, rugged defenceman, was in high demand among Canadian professional clubs, playing with four clubs in four leagues from 1908 to 1913.

McNamara was one of the best open ice checkers of his day. He would help the Toronto Blueshirts win the 1914 Stanley Cup. His professional hockey career was interrupted in 1916 when he enlisted in the Canadian Army during the First World War, along with brother Harold. He was a member of the 228th Battalion team that played in the National Hockey Association before being ordered overseas on February 10, 1917. McNamara helped organize the Battalion's hockey team, and coached the junior affiliate. As many of the members of the 228th Battalion had rail construction and operation experience, it was re-designated as the 6th Battalion of the Canadian Railway Troops. McNamara served in this capacity for the duration of the war, and was Mentioned in Dispatches and promoted to major before being discharged and returning to Canada in March 1919.

After returning from the service, McNamara became the coach of the Sault Ste. Marie Greyhounds and led the team to the Allan Cup championship in 1924. George and Howard founded the McNamara Construction Company and developed it into a prosperous firm.

He died in Miami, Florida on March 10, 1952.

He was inducted posthumously into the Hockey Hall of Fame in 1958.

Career statistics

Regular season and playoffs

References

Bibliography

External links

1886 births
1952 deaths
Canadian ice hockey defencemen
Canadian people of Irish descent
Hockey Hall of Fame inductees
Ice hockey people from Ontario
Montreal Shamrocks players
People from Penetanguishene
Sault Ste. Marie Marlboros players
Stanley Cup champions
Toronto 228th Battalion players
Toronto Blueshirts players
Toronto Ontarios players
Toronto Shamrocks players
Toronto Tecumsehs players
Canadian military personnel of World War I
Canadian Expeditionary Force soldiers